"Fergus Sings the Blues" is the third single from the album When the World Knows Your Name by the Scottish rock band Deacon Blue. Writer Ricky Ross has stated in an interview with Johnnie Walker that the song was inspired by "Gael's Blue" by Scottish singer-songwriter Michael Marra.

Homesick James was mentioned by name in "Fergus Sings the Blues", by the lyric "Homesick James, my biggest influence". James & Bobby Purify were also name-checked in the following line, "Tell me why, James & Bobby Purify".

The main B-side is "Long Window to Love".  Some versions of the single contain one or more of the following additional B-sides: "London A to Z", and "Back Here in Beanoland".

The 10" vinyl and the standard CD single release of the single are entitled "Four Songs from Scotland".  The single was also released in the format of a 7" box single entitled "Souvenir from Scotland".

Track listings 
All songs written by Ricky Ross, except where noted:

Chart performance

References

Deacon Blue songs
1989 singles
Songs written by Ricky Ross (musician)
1988 songs
Columbia Records singles